Treat 'Em Rough is a 1942 film about a boxer directed by Ray Taylor and starring Eddie Albert.

Plot

Bill Kingsford, a prizefighter called the Panama Kid (Eddie Albert), returns to his hometown with his trainer Hotfoot (William Frawley (who later played "Fred Mertz" on I Love Lucy) and valet Snake Eyes (Mantan Moreland) when his father (Lloyd Corrigan) is accused of embezzling.

Bill becomes involved with his father's ravishing secretary (Peggy Moran), who tips him off that she overheard a couple of men planning to ambush Bill while he investigates his father's scandal. When one of those men is killed, police mistake the dead body's for Bill. He uses the time to solve the mystery and clear his dad's name.

Cast
 Eddie Albert as the Panama Kid (Bill Kingsford)
 Peggy Moran as Betty
 William Frawley as Hotfoot
 Lloyd Corrigan as Gray Kingsford
 Mantan Moreland as Snake Eyes

External links
Treat 'Em Rough in the Internet Movie Database
''Treat 'Em Rough in Turner Classic Movies
Treat 'Em Rough in TV Guide
Treat 'Em Rough at Moviefone
Treat 'Em Rough in the New York Times

1942 films
American black-and-white films
Films directed by Ray Taylor
Universal Pictures films
American crime drama films
1942 crime drama films
Films scored by Hans J. Salter
1940s English-language films
1940s American films